Šimon Szathmáry (born October 4, 1995) is a Czech professional ice hockey player. He is currently playing for Piráti Chomutov of the Czech Extraliga.

Szathmáry made his Czech Extraliga debut playing with Piráti Chomutov during the 2015-16 Czech Extraliga season.

His grandfather Jan Suchý was also an ice hockey player.

References

External links
 

1995 births
Living people
Piráti Chomutov players
Czech ice hockey defencemen
Sportspeople from Havlíčkův Brod
HC Dukla Jihlava players
Sportovní Klub Kadaň players
SK Horácká Slavia Třebíč players
HC Slavia Praha players